The following deaths of notable individuals related to American television occurred in 2019.

January

February

March

April

May

June

July

August

September

October

November

December

See also
2019 in American television
Deaths in 2019

Notes
 Body found on this date, actual date of death unknown.

References

2019 deaths
Lists of deaths in American television
2019 in American television
Deaths in American television